Firuraq (also Romanized as Fīrūraq; also known as Farūraq, Forūraq, Firoozfanagh, Fīrūq, Pereh, Phairas Pira, and Pīr Forūzān) is a city in the Central District of Khoy County, West Azerbaijan province, Iran. At the 2006 census, its population was 7,903 in 2,048 households. The following census in 2011 counted 8,837 people in 2,504 households. The latest census in 2016 showed a population of 9,190 people in 2,640 households.

References 

Khoy County

Cities in West Azerbaijan Province

Populated places in West Azerbaijan Province

Populated places in Khoy County